Chiya Hamid Sharif Known as Chiya Sharif. He was born on September 15, 1975 in the Zakho region of Dohuk Governorate. He is Kurdish politician and member of the Kurdistan Democratic Party(KDP). He is currently a member of the Kurdistan Parliament. " Chiya Sharif " is a member of the Kurdistan Community and Relations Committee, and vice-chairman of the Parliamentary Affairs Committee in the Kurdistan Parliament. " Chiya Sharif " is fluent in Kurdish, Persian, Dutch, English, Arabic and Turkish.

Academic Achievement 
 Bachelor; Albeda University, Health (1997 - 2002).
 Master's; Health Administration (2002 - 2003).
 Kurdistan Democratic Party Academy (2012).

Political and Positions 
 Translator of Kurdish, Persian and Dutch languages for refugees (1998 - 2004).
 Member of the Eighth Branch of the Organization Office of the Kurdistan Democratic Party (2005 - 2009).
 Head of Cardiothoracic Surgery Department (2000 - 2004).
 Member of the Kurdish Cultural Association Committee (1994 - 2004).
 Member of the working body in the eighth branch, responsible for the elections office, from 2012 until now.
 Member of the Eighth Branch of the Office of Public and Professional Organizations (2009 - 2012).

References

See also 
 Kurdistan Parliament

Living people
Kurdish politicians
1975 births
People from Zakho